Senator Wise may refer to:

Bob Wise (born 1948), West Virginia State Senate
Henry A. Wise (New York state senator) (1906–1982), New York State Senate
J. J. Wise (1867–1930), Ohio State Senate
Max Wise (born 1975), Kentucky State Senate
Seelig Wise (1913–2004), Mississippi State Senate
Stephen R. Wise (born 1941), Florida State Senate
Thomas Dewey Wise (born 1939), South Carolina State Senate